St. John's College, started in 1915 and is the only boys' school in Nugegoda, Sri Lanka. It contains two primary sections and upper school. Nugegoda had no English School until 1915. St. John's School commenced with 14 pupils on 5 May 1915. In 1934, the mixed school of St. John's was separated into separate Boys and Girls schools, with the boys school known as the College of St. John, Nugeogda.

History

In 1915, five Wardens of the Church of St. John, led by the John Henry Wickramanayake, secured a piece of land in Nugegoda from the Anglican Bishop of Colombo. They collected money to establish an English School with fifteen students.

Initially it was a Christian Mission school and the first principal of the school was Wickramanayake. In 1934, the mixed school was separated into Girls' and Boys' schools. The girls' school was known as St. John's Girls' School and boys' school was known as St John's Boys' College. The schools were under the church of SS Mary and John, Nugegoda.

There was a Tamil stream as well but the classes were initially at the boys' school and then transferred to a building adjacent to the church. It became a separate school and was called Tamil Maha Vidyalaya. In 1963 under the government re-organisation of schools, all English medium classes were transferred to St Joseph's Convent.

Past principals

C. E. Rubasinghe (1934–1935)
Rev. Clarence Pieris (1935–1937)
J. H. Hill (1937–1939)
Rev. Canon Harold De Mel (1940–1947)
E. C. A. Navaratnaraja (1948–1957)
W. T. Canegeratne (1957–1958)
Samarawicrama (1958–1967)
W. T. Bannaheka (1967–1969)
C. K. Gamage (1970–1983)
L. A. J. Jayasundara (1984–1994)
R. A. R. Ranathunga (1994–1994)
S. Kodikara (1994–1995)
R. S. Jayasekara (1995–1996)
S. Athulathmudali (1996–1998)
Neville Kularatne (1998–1999)
Asoka Senanayake (2000–2002)
S. Dissanayake (2003–2006)
K. Jayasekara (2007–2008)
Maj. Liyangaskubura (2009–2012)
Maj. Wanaguru (2012–2014)
Maithreepala Liyanarachchi (2015–2017)
Buddhika Aththanayake (2017–present)

Houses

Copleston  (Lihini)   –     Yellow   –  
De Winton  (Hansa) –     Red        –  
Carpenter Garnier (Kokila)  –     Green    –  
Christopherson  (Mayura) –     Blue       –

Awards

Cyril Herath Memorial Trophy 
The Cyril Herath Memorial trophy (Johnian of the Year) is awarded to the best overall student in the school. Cyril Herath served as the country's Inspector General of Police between 1985 and 1988. The Cyril Herath Memorial Trophy has only been awarded twice in the school's history, 2011 and 2015. In 2011 Udesh Chandima Perera won this award and Navodh Jayasundara won the Cyril Herath Memorial Trophy in 2015.

Notable alumni

One of the first students, Ossie Abeyratne, became the first Dean of the Faculty of Medicine at the University of Colombo and another, Cyril Herath, the 22nd Inspector General of Police.

References

External links
 
 Johnian Walk and Old Boy's Talent Show

1915 establishments in Ceylon
Boys' schools in Sri Lanka
Educational institutions established in 1915
Schools in Colombo